"Bart vs. Itchy & Scratchy" is the eighteenth episode of the thirtieth season of the American animated television series The Simpsons, and the 657th episode overall. It aired in the United States on Fox on March 24, 2019. In the episode the in-universe show Itchy & Scratchy has a spin off created with the characters made female. Milhouse leads a group of boys to protest against the new show while Bart secretly joins a feminist protest group who perform acts of vandalism to protest against male female inequality and the backlash the Itchy & Scratchy show receives.

Plot
The Simpsons attend a convention where Krusty the Clown hosts a panel discussion about his show. After expressing frustration at fans who ask repetitive questions, he announces that "Itchy & Scratchy" will be rebooted with the characters re-cast as females. While Lisa is excited by the changes, Bart, Milhouse, Nelson, and Martin all express outrage and swear that they will never watch the show again in protest. Bart hosts a party where the boys make a point of not watching the show. However, he overhears Lisa recording a reaction video onto her phone as she watches the episode and decides to investigate. He laughs despite himself and is confronted by Lisa. When he lies to his friends about watching the episode, Lisa, having recorded his laugh, uploads the video online from her phone in revenge.

Lisa's video goes viral and Bart is confronted by his friends at school, who rebuke him for betraying his gender. They try to beat him up, but he takes shelter in the girls' bathroom where he meets Carmen, Erica and Piper; three sixth-grade girls. The girls call themselves "Bossy Riot" (a play on Pussy Riot) and carry out pranks in the name of feminism. Bart reveals himself to be El Barto and persuades them to let him join Bossy Riot by improving one of their pranks. In Bart's absence, the boys turn to Milhouse as their new leader. He forms the "Boys' Rights Association", or BRA, and they begin pressuring Krusty into reverting the changes to Itchy & Scratchy.

Bart and Bossy Riot carry out a series of pranks aimed at male authority figures around Springfield, with the girls giving him a purple mask allowing him to partake in the pranks with them undetected. The townspeople are afraid and their antics make the evening news. Lisa realizes that Bart is part of Bossy Riot when she sees a loose purple yarn string from his shorts and confronts him in his room. He initially denies it but immediately admits it when she says it destroys her vision of the entire universe. She accuses him of hiding behind causes he does not believe in to carry out pranks; Bart counters that while Lisa advocates causes, she has never had the courage to take action.

At Bossy Riot's meeting, they learn that Krusty has relented to BRA and will restore the male version of Itchy & Scratchy. In retaliation, Carmen, Erica and Piper plan to destroy the "Itchy & Scratchy" master tapes on live television, destroying "Itchy & Scratchy" forever. Bart protests their actions; causing the three girls to retaliate by tying him up and escaping before Lisa finds him.

Bart and Lisa make their way to Krusty's studios where the girls are about to drop the tapes into a vat of nail polish remover. As Bart unsuccessfully tries to reason with them through mansplaining, Lisa decides to take action, knocking the vat away at the last moment. The nail polish remover floods the studio floor and the fumes overwhelm the assembled members of BRA, causing them to break into tears. Lisa's actions are caught on camera, impressing Bossy Riot while BRA blame Milhouse for their humiliation after having their tears glycerized by the girls. As Bart says farewell to the girls, Lisa is inspired to take further action and joins Bossy Riot, while Bart agrees not to fight for causes he does not believe in. He gives Lisa his purple mask and as he watches Lisa and the girls ride away, he spray-paints a message on a wall that reads "The patriarchy is a weiner", implying that his time with Bossy Riot offered him more than a chance to cause mischief.

During the credits, Bart makes peace with his friends. They ask him about his time with the girls and much to their distress, he reveals that "they do not envy us".

Cultural references
Bossy Riot is a spoof of Pussy Riot, a Russian feminist protest punk rock and performance art group based in Moscow.

The song that plays during Bossy Riot’s prank montage is "Cherry Bomb" by The Runaways.

The song that plays at the end of the episode is "Extreme Ways" by Moby.

Reception
"Bart vs. Itchy & Scratchy" scored a 0.8 rating with a 4 share and was watched by 1.99 million people.

Dennis Perkins of The A.V. Club gave the episode a B stating, 
And if Bossy Riot's prankish crime spree (‘Eve was framed’ reads the doctored sign at the First Church Of Springfield) is depicted here as the half-formed eruption of the very real resentment engendered by the girls’ cultural awakening, ‘Bart Vs. Itchy & Scratchy’ bestows its ultimate approval in the quietly rousing finale. Lisa, despite rejecting Bossy Riot's rash plot to destroy the (unbacked-up) Itchy & Scratchy master tapes, makes the decision to don Bart's knit cap and pedal off with the big girls on their own wobbling but righteous crusade. (Lisa's genuinely trepidatious inner doubts about ‘pushing my beliefs further than they've ever gone’ before hopping on her bike is just the Lisa-Amram moment I was hoping for.) And Bart, weaned from his newfound comradeship by the revelation that he was ‘just kept around for fingerprints and DNA,’ yet whips out his pink spray paint and scrawls ‘The patriarchy is a wiener’ on a nearby wall. As Lisa correctly surmised, Bart was acting merely as a ‘mercenary in someone else's war,’ but the episode finds a lovely, hopeful, and sweetly subversive way to show that both Bart and Lisa learned something important, even in a trifling pop cultural stunt.

Tony Sokol of Den of Geek gave the episode a 4 out of 5 points stating, 
The Simpsons 'Bart vs. Itchy & Scratchy' is a formidable and forward thinking entry for the season. This season has consistently rewarded what might be universally accepted bad behavior. Tonight's main activity is vandalism. Bart doesn't admit being in Bossy Riot to his sister because she would in any way be happy or admire him for it. He does because she says knowing her brother is doing something she respects would destroy her entire vision of the universe. The episode skewers expectations. Every turn happens because of something somehow taboo, like laughing inappropriately, or admitting to the boys' club that girls don't envy them.

References

External links
 

The Simpsons (season 30) episodes
2019 American television episodes
LGBT-related animated television episodes